The pin-striped  finesnout ctenotus (Ctenotus nigrilineatus)  is a species of skink found in Western Australia.

References

nigrilineatus
Reptiles described in 1990
Taxa named by Glen Milton Storr